Azariah Boody (April 21, 1815 – November 18, 1885) was an American politician and a member of the United States House of Representatives from New York.

Biography
Born in Stanstead County in Lower Canada on April 21, 1815, Boody was the son of Jonathan and Nancy Evans Boody.  He moved to Massachusetts with his parents, who settled in Lowell. He attended the common schools, and moved to Rochester, New York, in 1850 where he engaged in agricultural pursuits. He was also trustee of the University of Rochester from 1853 to 1865. He married Ambia Corson.

Career
Elected  as a Whig to the Thirty-third United States Congress,  Boody served as a United States Representative for the twenty-ninth district of New York. He served from March 4 until his resignation on October 13, 1853, citing "pre-existing obligations."

Boody invested heavily in railroads, and was responsible for several New York lines (including the Genesee Valley Railroad, the Niagara Falls Railroad, and the Rochester, Lockport and Niagara Falls Railroad) being consolidated with others into the New York Central Railroad system. He also served on the board of directors of the Lake Erie, Wabash, and St. Louis Railroad Company, and was the president of the Wabash and Toledo Railroad Company until 1873.

Death and legacy
Boody died of pneumonia in New York, New York County, New York, on November 18, 1885 (age 70 years, 211 days). He is interred at Mount Hope Cemetery, Rochester, New York.
Boody's name is still honored by the University of Rochester community. There is or has been a "secret organization" called the Azariah Boody Society, dedicated to promoting school spirit. The popular school song "The Dandelion Yellow," written by Charles F. Cole and Richard L. Greenen in 1925, contains a verse commemorating Boody's donation of his cow pastures to the university:
O, Azariah Boody's cows were sleek and noble kine
They wandered o'er the verdant fields where grew the dandelion.
And when they drove the cows away to build a home for knowledge
They took the color from the flow'r and gave it to the college.

References

External links

History of the song "The Dandelion Yellow"
Azariah Boody Society
"The Dandelion Fellow: Azariah Boody" by Rachel Thibo
Boody's involvement in the history of Rochester
The Political Graveyard

1815 births
1885 deaths
Politicians from Rochester, New York
Whig Party members of the United States House of Representatives from New York (state)
19th-century American politicians
Deaths from pneumonia in New York City
19th-century American railroad executives
Businesspeople from Rochester, New York